Employment National was an Australian Government organisation tasked with assisting the unemployed receiving Newstart Allowance into employment. It was created as "Employment Assistance Australia" (EAA) by the Keating government's Employment Services Act 1994. It sought tenders for federal government funded employment work issued by the new "Employment Service Regulatory Agency" (ESRA). EAA largely operated out of Commonwealth Employment Service (CES) job centres.

Under the Howard government in 1998, the CES was abolished, ESRA became the Job Network, and EAA was renamed "Employment National". It was a large government-owned Job Agency competing with private ones, in this way being like Medibank Private was in the private health insurance sector during the period.

The agency and its final 165 offices were dissolved on July 30, 2003, with its functions being given to non-government Job Network providers.

References

2003 disestablishments in Australia
1998 establishments in Australia
Welfare in Australia
Defunct government entities of Australia
Unemployment in Australia